The Dry Corridor or Central American Dry Corridor (CADC) is a tropical dry forest region on the Pacific Coast of Central America. This area, which extends from southern Mexico to Panama, is extremely vulnerable to climate change due to much of the population living in rural areas and in poverty, and thus dependent on grain crops for their livelihood.

Particularly vulnerable to climate change are the areas of Guatemala, El Salvador, Honduras, and Nicaragua. Since 2001, these areas have suffered from irregular drought patterns due to changes in the El Niño-Southern Oscillation (ENSO). During an El Niño event in 2009 (the year the term “Dry Corridor” was penned), it is estimated that 50-100% of crops in these regions were affected by the water deficit, and between 2014 and 2016, millions of people in the dry corridor needed food aid due to drought during this period, which resulted in losses of the corn crop. By 2018, it was estimated that at least 25% of households in the region experienced food insecurity. As a result, relief agencies have been advised to take a “Food first” response when addressing this crisis, focusing initially on areas at highest risk of food insecurity.

Drought impact has been especially severe in Honduras and Guatemala.

2019 was the fifth straight year of drought, and the "second consecutive year of failed yields for subsistence farmers." The climate has been becoming hotter and drier, agricultural pests are increasing, spring rains are decreasing or absent, and floods have become heavier.

Approximately 8% of families in the region report that they plan to migrate in an attempt to improve their situations, with the increase in emigration of “500% between 2010 and 2015.” Up to 4 million climate change migrants from Central America and Mexico are projected by 2050, according to a World Bank report, if measures are not taken to prevent climate change and adapt agricultural practices. Migrants typically first travel to nearby urban areas, with fewer continuing north to Mexico, and fewer still traveling all the way to the USA border.

Climate migration such as that seen in the Dry Corridor is one of the sources of conflict at the US-Mexico border. In the US, Donald Trump has described migrations as “‘invasions’ of ‘gang members and very bad people,’” despite the US commissioner of the US Customs and border protection citing “crop failure” as a main driver. Complicating this strained relationship is the fact that the “US has done more than any other country to cause global warming,” and thus are at least somewhat responsible for the conditions of these migrants.

Improvement in the region will need to be addressed from multiple angles, including providing short-term food security and assistance, addressing climate change on a global scale, and sustainable development initiatives to promote robust crop production in these areas facing new climates.

See also 
 Central American migrant caravans
 Climate refugees
 Northern Triangle of Central America

References

External links 
 Central American dry corridor Information Resource Center
 Dry Corridor Alliance

Geography of Central America
Agriculture in North America
Environment of Central America
Climate change
Droughts in North America